Loren Cristian Jackson (born December 15, 1996) is an American professional basketball player who plays for SC Derby of the ABA League.

Early life and high school career
Jackson is the son of Loren Brian Jackson, the founder and basketball coach at Victory Rock Prep in Bradenton, Florida. Jackson played at Victory Rock Prep. As a senior, Jackson averaged 22.2 points and 7.3 assists per game.

College career
Jackson began his college career at Long Beach State. After not receiving much playing time as a freshman, he decided to transfer to Akron. His father was friends with Akron coach John Groce and Jackson wanted to play with former high school teammate Deng Riak. Jackson scored in double figures in seven straight games in January and February 2019, and evolved into Akron's go-to player despite his short stature. As a sophomore, Jackson averaged 13.9 points and 3.1 assists per game.
Jackson scored a career-high 35 points in three games, versus Ohio, Bowling Green, and Buffalo. As a junior, Jackson averaged 19.8 points and 4.5 assists per game. He was named Mid-American Conference Player of the Year. He also surpassed the 1,000 point mark during the season. Jackson got player of the week twice so far this year (2021). In 2020 he got named player of the year. He has a count of 31 points in the games he plays for Akron and assists for points and a lot of 3 pointers in all his games

Professional career
On June 25, 2021, Jackson signed with Chorale Roanne Basket of the LNB Pro A.

References

External links
Akron Zips bio
Long Beach State bio

1996 births
Living people
American men's basketball players
American expatriate basketball people in France
Akron Zips men's basketball players
Basketball players from Chicago
Chorale Roanne Basket players
Long Beach State Beach men's basketball players
Point guards